Basil de Sélincourt (19 August 1876 – 16 February 1966) was a British essayist and journalist.

In 1902 he married the orientalist Beryl de Zoete, but the marriage failed, and in 1908 he married the writer Anne Douglas Sedgwick (1873–1935). Basil de Sélincourt's third wife was Julia Sanford Chapin

De Sélincourt died in Moreton-in-Marsh, Gloucestershire in February 1966.

Works
Giotto (1905)
William Blake (1909)
Walt Whitman A Critical Study (1914)
The English Secret and Other Essays (1923)
The Religion of the Spirit (1927)
Selected Poems of William Blake (1927) editor
Pomona  or the Future of English (1928)
Towards Peace and Other Essays Critical or Constructive (1932)
Enjoyment of Music (Hogarth Press)
Anne Douglas Sedgwick: A Portrait in Letters (1936)

References

External links
 

20th-century British writers
1876 births
1966 deaths
British essayists
British male journalists
British male essayists
20th-century essayists
20th-century British male writers